Parachrysina truquii is a beetle of the family Scarabaeidae. It is found in Mexico.

References 

Rutelinae